Viking Crown was a side project started by heavy metal musician Phil Anselmo in the mid-1990s. The first Viking Crown release was an EP recorded in 1994 titled Unorthodox Steps of Ritual which featured Anselmo, credited as Anton Crowley, on guitar, bass, drums and vocals. The two later releases would feature Necrophagia frontman Killjoy on vocals and Anselmo's now-ex-wife Stephanie Opal Weinstein on keyboards. Killjoy would later go on to describe Viking Crown as "a selfish band in which we recorded without regard for conventional methods, songwriting, or any goals except to make truly dark depressing, lo-fi black metal that we liked." Following an interview in which Anselmo regarded the project as a joke, there was a fallout between himself and Killjoy that would culminate in Anselmo leaving all Baphomet Records related projects altogether.

Band members
 Phil Anselmo (as Anton Crowley) – vocals, guitars, bass, drums
 Killjoy – vocals
 Stephanie Opal Weinstein (as Opal Enthroned) – keyboards

Discography

Sources
 Rock Detector
Album Review - Chronicles of Chaos
Allmusic biography
2001 Album Review - Allmusic

Heavy metal musical groups from Louisiana
Musical groups from New Orleans
American black metal musical groups
Musical groups established in 1994
Season of Mist artists